Rick Glumac is a software engineer and environmentalist Canadian politician, who was elected to the Legislative Assembly of British Columbia in the 2017 provincial election.

As an MLA (Member of the Legislative Assembly) for the British Columbia New Democratic Party, he represents the riding of Port Moody - Coquitlam, which encompasses the western part of the city of Coquitlam, the entire city of Port Moody, and the villages of Anmore and Belcarra.

Glumac served as the Parliamentary Secretary for Technology for the Government of British Columbia until November 2020. He is also the provincial representative to the Pacific Northwest Economic Region, and association of Western Canadian provinces and Western US States. In December 2020, he was appointed as Premier's Liaison to Washington State.

Early life 
Glumac grew up in Port Alberni, BC. In 1995, he graduated with a degree in Electronics Engineering from Simon Fraser University.

Glumac worked much of his career in the field of computer graphics as an Software Developer, FX Artist, and a Computer Graphics Supervisor.  He worked on the first computer animated TV show ReBoot, and later worked for companies such as DreamWorks and Electronic Arts on well-known Hollywood films such as Shrek 2, Madagascar, and Over The Hedge. Following this he worked as a software developer, developing apps for iPhone.

Career in Politics 
Glumac was first elected to Port Moody City Council in 2011. He was re-elected in 2014 with the highest vote share of any candidate. On council he chaired various committees including  the Environmental Protection Committee and Economic Development Committee which recommended the hiring of an Economic Development Officer to grow the city's business tax base. 

During his time as a Councillor, he served as the Vice President of the Lower Mainland Local Government Association. Glumac was also elected as the Vancouver Metro Area Representative to the Union of B.C. Municipalities (UBCM). He has served on Metro Vancouver's Zero Waste Committee and on the Fraser Health Municipal Government Advisory Council.

As an MLA, he chaired the following legislative committees:

 Special Committee to Review the Freedom of Information and Protection of Privacy Act which authored the report titled FIPPA for the Future
 Select Standing Committee on Agriculture, Fish, and Food to investigate opportunities for carbon sequestration in soil

He vice-chaired the following committee:

 Select Standing Committee on Public Accounts which has oversight on government services. 

He also served on the following legislative committees:

 Select Standing Committee on Children and Youth which authored a report titled Children and Youth with Neuro-Diverse Special Needs 
 Special Committee on Reforming the Police Act which authored the report titled Transforming Policing and Community Safety in British Columbia
 Special Committee to Review the Personal Information Protection Act which authored the report titled Modernizing British Columbia's Private Sector Privacy Law
 Sustainable Shared Prosperity Cabinet Committee.

Glumac is credited with working with the B.C. Ministry of Health to protect the Eagleridge Hospital lands in Port Moody from being sold to private developers, stopping a plan by the BC Liberal government to condition new improvements to the hospital on the sale of the lands to private real estate developers.

Glumac consistently speaks in the Legislature to promote action to protect B.C.’s environment. On Tuesday, October 16, 2018 he spoke during the Legislature's emergency debate on climate change. He is a key supporter of the province's CleanBC strategy of reducing climate pollution and promoting renewable energies, lowering the costs of renewable energies, and helping create green jobs.

He is a staunch advocate for revitalizing Burrard Thermal, a former fossil fuel-powered power plant located on the Burrard Inlet into a home for clean technology or climate mitigation projects.

As Parliamentary Secretary for Technology, Glumac has championed innovation in the clean technologies as a tool for transitioning towards a green economy. He has advocated support for BC's clean energy and tech sectors which play an increasingly important role in the provincial economy.

Proposal in the Legislature 

On May 11, 2022, Rick Glumac proposed to his partner Haven Lurbiecki in the legislature, prior to question period.  Rick is the first member of the legislative assembly to propose in the legislature and likely the first in Canada.  Australian MP Tim Wilson proposed to his partner during a speech to Parliament in 2017.

Electoral Record

References

British Columbia New Democratic Party MLAs
Living people
People from Port Moody
British Columbia municipal councillors
Year of birth missing (living people)